Minister of Public Administration is the person in charge of the Ministry of Public Administration of Montenegro (Ministarstvo javne uprave). Tamara Srzentić, an independent politician is the current Minister of Public Administration, since 4 December 2020.

Ministers (2016–present)
 

 Deputy Prime Minister for Administration, Internal and Foreign Policy

References

Government ministries of Montenegro
Ministries established in 2016
2016 establishments in Montenegro